Vulaines-sur-Seine (literally Vulaines on Seine) is a commune in the Seine-et-Marne department in the Île-de-France region in north-central France.

Twin towns
It is twinned with the village of Barby, Northamptonshire, United Kingdom.

Population

Inhabitants of Vulaines-sur-Seine are called Vulaignots.

See also
Communes of the Seine-et-Marne department

References

External links

Communes of Seine-et-Marne